Fast Forward is the 19th studio album by British singer-songwriter Joe Jackson. The album and tracklist were officially announced via Jackson's official website and was scheduled for a mid-fall release. The record was later released worldwide on 2 October 2015. Excluding his classical releases and film work, the album is his thirteenth studio project.

The album was developed out of plans for a series of four-track EPs, each relating to a specific city. Eventually, the EPs were combined and arranged into a full-length studio album. The four cities represented are New York City, Berlin, Amsterdam, and New Orleans, with each of the city's specific tracks having been arranged and recorded there. Jackson worked with a different set of musicians in each location. There are two covers on the album, a remake of Television's "See No Evil", and a rendition of the 1930s German cabaret song "Good Bye Johnny".

On 14 July 2015, Jackson released "A Little Smile" as an album teaser via the Caroline Music YouTube channel. On 13 August the album's first single, the titular "Fast Forward", was uploaded on SoundCloud.

Track listing
All songs written and arranged by Joe Jackson, except where noted.

Personnel 
 Musicians 
 Joe Jackson 
-- Performing on the New York recording
 Regina Carter - violin
 Bill Frisell - guitar
 Brian Blade - drums
 Graham Maby - bass, vocals
-- Performing on the Amsterdam recording
 Aram Kersbergen - bass
 Benedikt Enzler - cello
 Stefan Kruger - drums
 Mitchell Sink - vocals
 Guido Nijs - saxophone
 Jan Van Duikeren - trumpet
 Edith Van Moergastel - viola
 Borika Van Den Booren, Michael Waterman - violin
 Claus Tofft - percussion
-- Performing on the Berlin recording
 Greg Cohen - bass
 Earl Harvin - drums
 Dirk Berger - guitar
 Markus Ehrlich - tenor saxophone
 Dima Bondarev - trumpet
-- Performing on the New Orleans recording
 Donald Harrison, Jr. - alto saxophone
 Robert Mercurio - bass
 Stanton Moore - drums
 Jeffrey Raines - guitar
 Big Sam Williams - trombone
 John Michael Bradford - trumpet

 Production
 Joe Jackson - arrangements, producer
 Patrick 'Pat' Dillett - recording engineer (New York)
 Kasper Frenkel - recording engineer (Amsterdam)
 Misha Kachkachishvili - recording engineer (New Orleans)

Charts

References

External links 
 Fast Forward album information at The Joe Jackson Archive

2015 albums
Joe Jackson (musician) albums